Soy is the second studio album by Argentine singer Lali and was released on 20 May 2016 by Sony Music Entertainment Argentina. The album is the follow-up to her debut studio album A Bailar (2014). The album's lead single and title track "Soy" was released on 5 May 2016. It received a nomination for Best Female Pop Album at the 2017 Gardel Awards.

Background
In an interview with Argentine newspaper La Nación in June 2015, Espósito confirmed that she had begun working on her sophomore studio album while she was touring with her A Bailar Tour and between Esperanza mía's shootings. In the same interview, the singer stated: "This second album squeezes a little more on everything, in hip-hop and dance [genres]; it is more definited. It will be such a rhythmic album, bound to dance, but I have used that title already [A Bailar]." In an interview for Rolling Stone magazine, Espósito admitted: "I'm very into the soul and gospel music, but I also want to trighten nuts on the dance and hip-hop music because the performances in my shows are a very important part". After a little holiday the first days of 2016, Espósito started recording the album and in April that same year, she traveled to Miami to mix it at The Hit Factory Criteria. In an interview with Intrusos, Espósito said: "There are some things that are related with my relationship with Mariano [Martínez] and some other things with my previous relationship [with Benjamín Amadeo]. Every single track has something. The album is called Soy because I am sharing the truth about what I think and feel. It is super personal." About the album, Espósito stated: "It is living meat, these are the songs that I wrote, it is just something that I had been waiting for a while". In an interview with El Telégrafo, Espósito admitted that twenty songs were written but only thirteen of them were included in the album. As regarding to the seven excluded tracks, Espósito didn't discard the possibility of include them on a deluxe edition or on her next album.

Release and promotion
On 28 April, Espósito revealed the title and album cover in a fan trivia competition. The album pre-sale started on 2 May 2016. The album launch party took place on 20 May 2016 and was an exclusive event for 1,000 of those who had purchased the album on the pre-sale. To promote the album, Espósito made a few interviews in radio and television programs. A few hours after its release, the album was certified gold by the Argentine Chamber of Phonograms and Videograms Producers (CAPIF) for selling over 20,000 copies in Argentina. Soy reached the No. 1 position on the iTunes charts of Argentina and Paraguay, and charted within the Top 5 on iTunes of countries like Colombia, Peru, Israel and Spain. In the United States, the album peaked at No. 4 on the Latin iTunes chart.

Tour

Espósito announced the dates for the first leg of the Soy Tour on 27 May 2016. The tour began on 8 September 2016 in Buenos Aires, Argentina and has travelled across Latin America, Europe and  the Middle East. For the fifth leg of the tour, Espósito renamed the tour to "Lali en Vivo" due to all the changes that the show had suffered. This renewed tour began in November 2017 with two sold-out shows at the Luna Park Arena in Buenos Aires. She also served as an opening act for various international acts, including Katy Perry on her Witness: The Tour and girlband Fifth Harmony on their 7/27 Tour.

Critical reception

The album received "the best reviews from the critics". Jorge Luis Santa María from the Mexican website Digitall Post summarized that Soy "is an album that shows her [Espósito] as she is without barriers, and includes stories that a person of her age can actually live or see". Belén Fourment from the Uruguayan journal El País opined that "even though there is some schizophrenia in Soy because it jumps from one genre to another without cushioning the fall, Espósito takes one more step with this album, she experiments, shows herself as she is, and that is always valuable" In the same review, it is said that the album has an "electropop sound, with very explosive passages and some distorted guitars that slips, but also has some striking turns".

Jenny Morgan from Viva Latin Pop reviewed that "the album flows between a range of genres that include dance, club, pop, rock, and soul" and that "Lali’s vocal range blends well with all the genres she includes on this album". The reviewer also compared Espósito's sound with Belinda's but "with a better voice". Morgan ensured that the singer "will be breaking records with this release" and gave the album four and a half from five stars. Billboard Brasil named Soy as one of best 30 albums of 2016, and stated that it is "a very diverse album that does not lack anything".

Popfection reviewer Dan highlighted Espósito's "chameleonic" voice through the record, and alluded to its production, writing: "it has been produced so badly that you cannot even find the bass frequencies in the mixes". For him, the fault of this is of the "inexperienced or straight up bad producers" and the "economic limitations" that Sony Music Argentina might face in order to finance an album. The reviewer concluded that "Lali has a lot of potential" but "a better team behind the making of the record would most definitely help", and gave the album six and a seventh stars out of 10.

Year-end lists

Accolades
The album received a nomination for Best Female Pop Album at the 19th Annual Gardel Awards. Espósito had won in this category at the 17th Annual Gardel Awards for A Bailar.

Commercial performance
In Argentina, Soy debuted at No. 1 and was certified Gold by the Argentine Chamber of Phonograms and Videograms Producers three hours after its release for album sales equivalent of 20,000 units. In Uruguay, the album debuted at No. 1 and stayed in the top for four months. On 6 December 2016, Soy was certified Gold by the Uruguayan Disc Chamber for selling over 2,000 units.

In Italy, the album debuted at No. 5 and was the highest-charting non-Italian album of the week. Soy debuted at No. 6 in Spain and at No. 82 in Mexico, where it eventually peaked at No. 27.

Musical content

Singles
The lead single and title track "Soy" was released as a surprise on 5 May 2016, along with the pre-sale of the album. Espósito said that the song is "a simple but deep definition to understand what it means to be oneself." She added that "[The lyrics] are my thoughts, my joys, my pains, stories and beliefs made song; music that makes us feel alive, that makes us be". The song peaked at No. 5 on the Argentina National Top 20 and at No. 15 on the Ecuador Pop 20, both provided by Monitor Latino.

On 4 September 2016, "Boomerang" was sent to radio as the second single off the album. The song is described as a karmic way of seeing things from the concept that everything returns. Santiago Torres from Billboard Argentina described the song as "of the album's most modern material" and named it "an insured hit due to its funny tune".

"Ego" was released as the third single off Soy on 14 December 2016. Its music video was shot in Villa La Angostura, Argentina in early November. The song has been compared with the previous promotional single "Unico" as not directly compatible compositions, but it was said that they both clearly reflect the life moments of a girl who still encourages to write, but now from a more intimate place. The song peaked at No. 4 and No. 15 on the Monitor Latino's Argentina National Top 20 and Argentina Latin Top 20 charts, respectively.

Promotional singles
"Unico" was released as a promotional single on 20 March 2016. The song was intended to be the lead single off Soy, but then it was changed to "Soy". Espósito had performed the song before its release at two previous shows of her A Bailar Tour in Buenos Aires on 18 and 19 March. The song peaked at No. 5 in Paraguay and at No. 23 in Ecuador. Espósito stated that "Unico" is about "Some loves [that] are so deep and crucial that deserve to be heard as one, different and that have changed our heart[s]." The singer also admitted that the song was written to her ex-boyfriend Benjamín Amadeo by saying that "Unico is for the one who changed my way of seeing the world. Such was this love that it let me fly even though [I] was suffering. [It was] a unique love that I will always remember as a big truth. Personally, it [the song] is for person with whom I shared years of my life, real life. Unico is for everyone who loves beyond saying goodbye".

The second promotional single, "Tu Revolución", was released on 21 December 2016. The song is described as a 3.0 dubstep in which Espósito risks herself with a less self-look and tries to send to her young public a reflexive message. Belén Fourment from El País said that the song is "a valuable effort, especially for the supposed superficiality of her firsts songs [the A Bailar ones]".

Songs
"Mi Religión", the eighth track of the album, and "Soy" are said the most personal songs of the album. "Amor es presente" is downtempo ballad with a gospel influence and some pop arrangements that remind us to Bandana's style. The last track of the album, "Reina", is a tribute to the British rock band Queen, which is one of Espósito's biggest influences. "The song reminds us to Queen's Bohemian Rhapsody as it has a guitar solo similar to Brian May's style."

"Ego", "Boomerang" and "Ring Na Na", the fifth, sixth and eleventh tracks respectively, are the only tracks that counted with co-writers on its composition, Gavin Jones, Tobias Lundgren, Johan Fransson and Tim Larsson in the first one, Will Simm and Ayak Thiik in "Boomerang", and Michael Angelo, Eric McCarthy and David Kaneswaran in the eleventh track, aside from Espósito and her producers, Gustavo Novello, Pablo Akselrad and Luis Burgio. The last one is described as a love song that distinguishes between a dancehall style and a sexy pop. It has been compared to Nicki Minaj's EDM sound on her album Pink Friday: Roman Reloaded. Meanwhile, "Lejos de Mí" is described as "a kick ass strong song that almost overpowers everything else on the album" by Jenny Morgan from Pop en Español. The reviewer also compared the song with Mónica Naranjo's "rock opera style of music" in 4.0. In a review for Popfection, Espósito's highs during the chorus of "Irresistible" were compared to the ones by Mariah Carey's in "Emotions", while "Cree en Mí" was praised for combining both an amazing vocal delivery and perfect amount of drama with a catchy melody. Both songs were listed as "essentials".

Track listing

Chart performance

Weekly charts

Monthly charts

Year-end charts

Certifications

Release history

Credits and personnel
The following people contributed to Soy:

Nano Novello – engineer, musical direction, production, management, booking, composer, piano, programming, bass, guitar
Facundo Yalve – engineer
Dario Calequi – engineer
Julián Burgio – assistant
Emilio Oivero – master tune
Tobias Lundgren – engineer, production, composer, background vocals
Johan Fransson – engineer, production, composer, violin
Tim Larsson – engineer, production, composer, programming, drums
Will Simm – engineer, production, composer, drums, violin, bass, synthesizers, piano, programming
Michael Angelo – engineer, production, composer, drums, synthesizers, bass, piano, programming
Antonella Giunta – vocal coach, background vocals
Roberto Tito Vázquez – mixing
Chris Gehringer – mastering
Peter Akselrad – musical direction, production, management, booking, composer, guitar, talk box, background vocals
Luis Burgio – musical direction, production, management, booking, composer, drums, background vocals, kazoo
Ariel Chichotky – production, management, booking
Pablo Durand – A&R direction
Javier Caso – A&R
Lali Espósito – primary artist, composer, lead vocals
Josefina Silveyra – background vocals
Gavin Jones – composer
Ayak Thiik – composer
Alan Ballan – bass
Diego Mercado – background vocals
Eric McCarthy – composer
Davin Kaneswaran – composer
Alejo von der Pahlen – sax, background vocals
Ervin Stutz – trumpet, trombone
Omar Souto – art direction
Machado Cicala Morassut – photography
Juan Manuel Cativa – hair stylist
Marina Venancio – make-up, styling
Geri Capucci – assistant
Gime Catalano – nail art

See also
List of number-one albums in Argentina
Music of Argentina
2016 in Latin music

References

2016 albums
Lali Espósito albums
Spanish-language albums
Sony Music Argentina albums